(Frederick) Lloyd Sharpin was Archdeacon of Bombay from 1886 until 1888.

Sharpin was educated at Bedford School and Exeter College, Oxford. He was ordained in  1862. After a curacy in Northill he was Chaplain at Nasirabad, often acting as  Acting Archdeacon.

After his years as Archdeacon he held the living at Millbrook, Bedfordshire for 21 years; and Rural Dean of Ampthill for 11. He died on 2 June 1921.

References

1879 births
1946 deaths
Archdeacons of Bombay
Alumni of Keble College, Oxford
Alumni of Lincoln Theological College
People educated at Heversham Grammar School
People from Northill
People from Central Bedfordshire District